Still You is a 2012 South Korean television series starring Shin Eun-kyung, Kim Seung-soo, Wang Bit-na and Song Jae-hee. It aired on SBS from May 21 to December 3, 2012 on Mondays to Fridays at 19:30 for 124 episodes.

Plot
Soon-young divorces her husband Han-joon legally due to his business troubles, but they carry on having a happy married life. But the "fake divorce" turns real when Han-joon's old flame Chae-rin comes back and offers him her financial assistance in exchange for choosing her. In order to get her husband back, Soon-young tries to make Han-joon jealous by dating his rival Woo-jin. But Soon-young and Woo-jin begin to develop feelings for each other.

Cast
 Shin Eun-kyung as Cha Soon-young
 Kim Seung-soo as Na Han-joon
 Wang Bit-na as Kang Chae-rin
 Song Jae-hee as Kang Woo-jin

Han-joon's family
 Jang Seo-won as Na Doo-joon
 Kim Sung-eun as Shin Na-ra
 Lee Se-na as Na Se-hee
 Yoon Mun-sik as Na Yoo-seok
 Lee Chae-mi as Na Mi-so

Chae-rin's family
 Kim Sung-kyum as Kang Beom-seok
 Park Jung-soo as Kim Yi-hyun
 Lee Eun-jung as Kang Hee-jin

Extended cast
 Lee Deok-hee as Seo Nam-joo
 Yoon Hyun-min as Lee Jae-ha
 Go Myung-hwan as Sung Dong-chul
 Hwang Hyo-eun as Lee Kyung-joo
 Nam Kyung-eub as Baek Hwa-soo
 Jung Ye-ji as Jang Hyun-hee
 Seo Yun-ah as Son Myung-ji
 Jang Ka-hyun

References

External links
Still You official SBS website 

Seoul Broadcasting System television dramas
2012 South Korean television series debuts
2012 South Korean television series endings
Korean-language television shows
South Korean romance television series
South Korean melodrama television series